This is a list of the published novels set in the fantasy world of Dragonlance, which was originally created as a setting for the Dungeons & Dragons tabletop role-playing game.

Novels

Unreleased

Anthologies 
The Dragonlance short story collections are mainly divided into the two publishing lines Tales and Dragons Anthologies. With most recent collections the dividing line has been somewhat erased.
In the following are the short story collections listed in chronological order of their publishing dates.

Tales I

Tales II 
Although some versions refer to these three books as the Tales II trilogy, others refer to them belonging to the original Tales trilogy, continuing from volume IV (this is because they were originally published as two trilogies and later renumbered as one six-book series).

Dragons Anthologies

Tales of the Fifth Age

Tales/Dragons from the War of Souls/World of Krynn 
These three collections are presented as a trilogy by their outer appearance as well as by their title constructions.

Further Dragons Anthologies

Best Of Anthologies

Young Adult Readers Novels

Young Adult Chronicles 
These novels are adaptions of the original Chronicles Trilogy to a format specifically targeted at young readers.
 A Rumor of Dragons (June 2003), by Margaret Weis and Tracy Hickman,
 Night of the Dragons (June 2003), by Margaret Weis and Tracy Hickman,
 The Nightmare Lands (October 2003), by Margaret Weis and Tracy Hickman,
 To the Gates of Palanthas (October 2003), by Margaret Weis and Tracy Hickman,
 Hope's Flame (December 2003), by Margaret Weis and Tracy Hickman,
 A Dawn of Dragons (March 2004), by Margaret Weis and Tracy Hickman,

Elements 
 Pillar of Flame (January 2007), by Ree Soesbee,
 Queen of the Sea (July 2007), by Ree Soesbee,
 Tempest's Vow (April 2008), by Ree Soesbee,

Elidor Trilogy 
 Crown of Thieves (November 2005), by Ree Soesbee,
 The Crystal Chalice (March 2006), by Ree Soesbee,
 City of Fortune (July 2006), by Ree Soesbee,

Goodlund Trilogy 
 Warrior's Heart (November 2006), by Stephen D. Sullivan,
 Warrior's Blood (May 2007), by Stephen D. Sullivan,
 Warrior's Bones (November 2007), by Stephen D. Sullivan,

New Adventures 
 Temple of the Dragonslayer (July 2004), by Tim Waggoner,
 The Dying Kingdom (July 2004), by Stephen D. Sullivan,
 The Dragon Well (September 2004), by Dan Willis,
 Return of the Sorceress (November 2004), by Tim Waggoner,
 Dragon Sword (January 2005), by Ree Soesbee,
 Dragon Day (March 2005), by Stan Brown,
 Dragon Knight (May 2005), by Dan Willis,
 Dragon Spell (July 2005), by Jeff Sampson,

Suncatcher Trilogy 
 The Wayward Wizard (September 2006), by Jeff Sampson,
 The Ebony Eye (March 2007), by Jeff Sampson,
 The Stolen Sun (September 2007), by Jeff Sampson,

Trinistyr Trilogy 
 Wizard's Curse (October 2005), by Christina Woods,
 Wizard's Betrayal (January 2006), by Jeff Sampson,
 Wizard's Return (May 2006), by Dan Willis,

Related stories 
The following two books are crossovers in which Lord Soth and others are transported to the Ravenloft world.

 Knight of the Black Rose (December 1991), by James Lowder,
 Spectre of the Black Rose (March 1999), by James Lowder and Voronica Whitney-Robinson,

Six novels set in the Spelljammer universe were published by TSR before TSR was incorporated into Wizards of the Coast.  The novels were interconnected and formed "The Cloakmaster Cycle". The novels tell the story of Teldin Moore, a 'groundling' farmer on Krynn who has a powerful and apparently cursed magical cloak that was given to him. The series puts the character on a quest, and showcases the Spelljammer universe.

 Beyond the Moons by David Cook, (July, 1991)

References

External links 
 Dragonlance Product Catalog at Wizards of the Coast.

Novels
 
Fantasy novel series
Lists of fantasy books
Dragonlance